Ifugao, officially the Province of Ifugao, is a landlocked province of the Philippines in the Cordillera Administrative Region in Luzon. Its capital is Lagawe and it borders Benguet to the west, Mountain Province to the north, Isabela to the east, and Nueva Vizcaya to the south.

The Rice Terraces of the Philippine Cordilleras and Banaue Rice Terraces are the main tourist attractions in the province. These terraces are believed to have been hand-carved into the mountains 2,000 years ago to plant rice. However, recent research by carbon dating suggests that they were built much later. In 1995, the Rice Terraces of the Philippine Cordilleras were declared as a UNESCO World Heritage Site. In 2008 and 2015, the Hudhud chants of the Ifugao and the Punnuk (Tugging rituals and games) were inscribed in the UNESCO Intangible Cultural Heritage Lists.

Etymology
Ifugao is named after the term i-pugo ("i" [from/people] and pugo [hill]), which translates to people of the hill. Alternatively, the province's name may have come from the word pugaw, which means "the cosmic earth", ipugaw then referring to "mortals". Finally, the name may have been derived from ipugo, a type of grain in local mythology given to the people by Matungulan, the god of grains.

History

Spanish regime
The Spanish had great difficulty in taking over Ifugao, like most of the Cordilleras due to the fierce belief of the Cordillera people of their rights since ancient times. The Ifugao battled colonizers for hundreds of years, even after the state was colonized and was transformed into a part of Nueva Vizcaya province of the Spanish-administered Philippines. In 1891, the Spanish government established Quiangan as a comandancia-politico-militar for the Ifugao area. The Spanish occupation in the province ended with the outbreak of the Philippine Revolution.

In the Northern Philippines, the Ifugao people are one of many minority ethnolinguistic groups best documented by ethnohistoric and anthropological scholars. However, there is a dearth of historical information in the region particularly during the Spanish conquest. Changes in both demographics and cultural orientation among existing communities were to be expected during the time as certain groups resulted to migration towards the highlands. According to studies, the Ifugao succeeded multiple times resisting against the Spanish at conquest. The groups that migrated to the highlands were believed to be those that resisted the Spanish colonial control, which became prevalent in the lowlands. According to Acabado, the rugged nature of the highlands around the Ifugao region did not out rightly provide a hindrance to the Spanish conquest. Other regions that had similar rugged environment as found in Ifugao were subjected to colonial rule. Archeological research shows Ifugao practices of successful resistance by strengthening their political and economic resources. Spanish conquest and population increase was the source of shifting to wet-rice agriculture.

American occupation

On August 18, 1908, Ifugao was separated from Nueva Vizcaya and, along with Amburayan, Apayao, Benguet, Bontoc, Kalinga and Lepanto, was annexed to the newly created Mountain Province established by the Philippine Commission with the enactment of Act No. 1876.

World War II
Ifugao became the center of warfare in the last year of World War II when Gen. Tomoyuki Yamashita launched his last stand against the American and Philippine Commonwealth forces at Mount Napulawan. He informally surrendered to Captain Grisham of the 6th US Army in the Philippines based in Kiangan, then formally surrendered at Camp John Hay on September 3, 1945.

Post-war era
On June 18, 1966, Republic Act No. 4695 was enacted, and Ifugao was converted into a regular province when the huge Mountain Province was split into four (the other three being Benguet, Mountain Province, and Kalinga-Apayao). Ifugao and Kalinga-Apayao were placed under the jurisdiction of the Cagayan Valley region. The capital was moved from Kiangan to Lagawe due to the harsh landscape of Kiangan which made it unsuitable for public transportation and as a capital.

Post-martial law era
On July 15, 1987, the Cordillera Administrative Region was established by then-President Corazon Aquino through Executive Order 220, and Ifugao was made one of its provinces.

Contemporary history

In 1992, Republic Act No. 07173 was enacted, separating several barangays from Kiangan and constituting them under a new municipality known as Asipulo.

Since 1992, the province has observed every September 2 as "Victory Day", commemorating the valor of Philippine war veterans and the surrender of General Yamashita in the municipality of Kiangan on September 2, 1945.

In 1995, the Batad Rice Terraces, Bangaan Rice Terraces (both in Banaue), Mayoyao Rice Terraces (in Mayoyao), Hungduan Rice Terraces (in Hungduan) and Nagacadan Rice Terraces (in Kiangan, Ifugao) were inscribed by UNESCO as a World Heritage Site under the collective name "Rice Terraces of the Philippine Cordilleras".

In 2001, the Hudhud Chants of the Ifugao was chosen as one of the 11 Masterpieces of the Oral and Intangible Heritage of Humanity. It was then formally inscribed as a UNESCO Intangible Cultural Heritage in 2008.

In 2013, the official Intangible Heritage Book of the Philippine was published, and 13 of its elements were from Ifugao.

In 2014, the Philippines joined other Asian nations in establishing the support and submission of the "Tug of war" — a multinational cultural heritage or Tugging rituals and games, an Intangible Cultural Heritage that encompasses tug-of-war games in Vietnam, Cambodia, and the Philippines. The initial move of the Philippines started in 2013. The Philippines' part in the new element is represented by the tug-of-war of the Ifugaos (in Barangay Hapao, Municipality of Hungduan) called the punnuk. The element is expected to be declared as a UNESCO Intangible Cultural Heritage in 2015.

Since the 20th century, the province has been central to the archaeological research of various international institutions, mostly from the United States and the Philippines. A major discovery was the archaeological site of Kiangan, which proved the oral tradition of the Ifugao that the first settlement in the province was in Kiangan.

Geography
Ifugao covers a total area of  occupying the southeastern section of the Cordillera Administrative Region in Luzon. The province is bordered by Benguet to the west, Mountain Province to the north, Isabela to the east, and Nueva Vizcaya to the south.

Situated within the Cordillera Central mountain range, Ifugao is characterized by rugged terrain, river valleys, and massive forests.

Administrative divisions
Ifugao comprises 11 municipalities, all encompassed by a lone legislative district.

Barangays
The 11 municipalities of the province comprise a total of 175 barangays, with Santa Maria in Alfonso Lista (Potia) as the most populous in 2010, and Banga in Lagawe as the least.

Climate
The rainy season in Ifugao begins in July and runs through January. The weather remains cool from November to February.

Demographics

Ethnicity

Based on the 2000 census survey, the Ifugao comprised  of the total provincial population of 161,483.

The total number of Tinguian in the province of Ifugao is 2,609. (source: Philippine Statistics Authority)

Religion
The Ifugao people have an indigenous religion unique to their traditional culture, and highly significant to the preservation of their life ways and valued traditions. They believe in the existence of thousands of gods, which may enter specific sacred objects such as the bul-ul.

Roman Catholicism has a growing influence in the province with approximately 60% of the population being converted by missionaries. In most areas, especially at the east and south of the province, indigenous traditions have degraded due to the influx of Christianity. In 2014, the Apostolic Vicariate of Bontoc-Lagawe recorded a 61.5% Roman Catholic adherence. The most significant religion other than Roman Catholicism is Protestantism that make up 20%-30% of the population and are mostly found in the central and south-western parts of this province. Other religions includes animism.

Wet rice cultivation and ritual feasting 
Shifting to wet rice cultivation is one factor that intensified the social ranking that was already present among the Ifugao society. Those who adopted wet rice cultivation were able to consolidate political resources. “In Ifugao, the adoption of wet-rice agriculture is at the forefront in discussions regarding social ranking vis-à-vis prestige economy.”  The Ifugao social status is based on their rice lands and ability to sponsor feasts. One reason being is that an individual needs to be skilled in mobilizing rice terraces, and because rice terraces require labor-intensive work. Stephen Acabado states that since the village was increasing in population, the shift to wet rice cultivation, increase of exotic goods procurement, and finally increase in the distribution of ritual animals indicates “political elaboration as a response to Spanish conquest.” In addition, according to Queeny G. Lapeña and Stephen B. Acabado, in order to successfully resist against a colonizing power it requires a constructive military organization within a complete polity. The Spanish took conquest of the Magat Valley and between 1600 CE and 1700 CE it drove the Ifugao to strategically resettle in the interior of the Cordillera Mountains. Wet-rice agriculture was adopted soon after, and extensive rice terraces were built. This was a subsistence shift for the Ifugao because they cultivated taro before the start of the wet rice cultivation. The author emphasizes that the Ifugao people kept their culture and identity alive by spending large amounts of time in rice fields, since they treated them as ritual areas to “reinforce community solidarity."

Furthermore, archeologists state that there was an increase of pig consumption. This increase had to do with the increase in ritual feasting. In the Old Kiyyangan Village, there were morphometric evidence of the vast increase in pig consumption. Stephen Acabado states that since the village was increasing in population the shift to wet rice cultivation, increase of exotic goods procurement, and finally increase in the distribution of ritual animals indicates “political elaboration as a response to Spanish conquest”. In the article Resistance through rituals: The role of Philippine “native pig” (Sus scrofa) in Ifugao feasting and socio-political organization, the authors conclude that domesticated pigs were intertwined in the maintenance of a rank social order that came into view from the Ifugao's resistance against Spanish colonialism.

The domestication of pigs and terrace cultivation within the Ifugao region provides a perfect scenario of how societies respond to challenges and needs in their immediate environment. Since wild pigs were considered unfit for rituals, emphasis was placed towards the domestication pigs, which illustrated an individual's social status. The bigger the feast, the higher regard a person was likely to receive from both kin and non-kin members as the ceremony would involve the sharing of sacrificed pig meat. The relationship between the elites who in this case owned the land and the lower social classes worsened during the period after the Spanish conquest. Social immobility became more apparent, since to have enough rice to trade for a pig, one would need to own a rice terrace and vice versa. The cultural value attached to the pig and rice cultivation guaranteed the survival of the communities, in spite of moving to the highlands as they migrated further from the invading Spanish. The importance of rituals and ceremonies meant that people were pushed into practicing pig domestication not merely as a source of food, but as a way of honoring their culture. On the other hand, the cultivation of rice on the terraces required extensive organization of labor, which led to the creation of socio-political shifts.

Rice culture 

The Spanish first described the Ifugao rice terraces in 1801. Though as William Scott notes, "These impressive stone-walled fields, irrigated for both rice and taro, had been known from the time of the first expeditions in to Kiangan in the 1750s..."

Ifugao culture revolves around rice, which is considered a prestige crop. There is an elaborate and complex array of rice culture feasts inextricably linked with taboos and intricate agricultural rites, from rice cultivation to rice consumption. Harvest season calls for grandiose thanksgiving feasts, while the concluding harvest rites tungo or tungul (the day of rest) entail a strict taboo of any agricultural work. Partaking of the rice wine (bayah), rice cakes, and moma (mixture of several herbs, powdered snail shell and betel nut/arecoline which is used as a chewing gum to the Ifugaos) is an indelible practice during the festivities and ritual activities. Agricultural terracing and farming are the principal means of livelihood. Their social status is measured by the number of rice field granaries, family heirlooms, gold earrings, and carabaos (water buffaloes). Prestige is also conferred through time and tradition.

A prayer is said by an elderly woman when harvest begins, directed towards Cabunian, the goddess of rice.  Then, a protective prayer is said before the rice is placed in the granary.

The Ifugao solar calendar included a 365-day year, broken down into 13 months of 28 days each, plus one extra day.

Ifugao culture values kinship, family ties, religious and cultural beliefs. Ifugao are unique among all ethnic groups in the mountain province for their narrative literature such as the hudhud, an epic dealing with hero ancestors sung in a poetic manner. Also unique to the Ifugao is their woodcarving art, most notably the carved granary guardians bulul and the prestige bench of the upper class, the hagabi. Their textiles are renowned for their sheer beauty, colorful blankets and clothing woven on looms.

Traditional attire for male Ifugaos consists of a simple G-string. Ifugao women, on the contrary, wear tapis, a wraparound skirt.

Economy

Infrastructure

Electricity

UNESCO recognitions in Ifugao
UNESCO has inscribed two Ifugao elements in the Representative List of the Intangible Cultural Heritage of Humanity in 2008 and 2015, respectively. UNESCO has also inscribed one Ifugao site with five properties in the World Heritage Site in 1995.

Rice Terraces of the Philippine Cordilleras

In 1995, the Rice Terraces of the Philippine Cordilleras was inscribed in the UNESCO World Heritage List. UNESCO states:

"For 2,000 years, the high rice fields of the Ifugao have followed the contours of the mountains. The fruit of knowledge handed down from one generation to the next, and the expression of sacred traditions and a delicate social balance, they have helped to create a landscape of great beauty that expresses the harmony between humankind and the environment."

The inscription has five sites: the Batad Rice Terraces, Bangaan Rice Terraces (both in Banaue), Mayoyao Rice Terraces (in Mayoyao), Hungduan Rice Terraces (in Hungduan) and Nagacadan Rice Terraces (in Kiangan), all in the Ifugao Province, the Philippines. The Banaue Rice Terraces are not included in the inscription, but may be included through an extension nomination to UNESCO, along with other rice terraces sites in other Philippine Cordillera provinces.

Hudhud Chants of the Ifugao
In 2001, the Hudhud ni Aliguyon (or Hudhud Chants of the Ifugao) became one of the first 11 Masterpieces of the Oral and Intangible Heritage of Humanity in 2001. The element was inscribed in the Representative List of the Intangible Cultural Heritage of Humanity in 2008. UNESCO describes the element as follows:

The Hudhud consists of narrative chants traditionally performed by the Ifugao community, which is well known for its rice terraces extending over the highlands of the northern island of the Philippine archipelago. It is practised during the rice sowing season, at harvest time and at funeral wakes and rituals. Thought to have originated before the seventh century, the Hudhud comprises more than 200 chants, each divided into 40 episodes. A complete recitation may last several days. Since the Ifugao’s culture is matrilineal, the wife generally takes the main part in the chants, and her brother occupies a higher position than her husband. The language of the stories abounds in figurative expressions and repetitions and employs metonymy, metaphor and onomatopoeia, rendering transcription very difficult. Thus, there are very few written expressions of this tradition. The chant tells about ancestral heroes, customary law, religious beliefs and traditional practices, and reflects the importance of rice cultivation. The narrators, mainly elderly women, hold a key position in the community, both as historians and preachers. The Hudhud epic is chanted alternately by the first narrator and a choir, employing a single melody for all the verses. The conversion of the Ifugao to Catholicism has weakened their traditional culture. Furthermore, the Hudhud is linked to the manual harvesting of rice, which is now mechanized. Although the rice terraces are listed as a World Heritage Site, the number of growers has been in constant decline.The few remaining narrators, who are already very old, need to be supported in their efforts to transmit their knowledge and to raise awareness among young people.

Tugging Games and Ritual: Punnuk of the Ifugao
The Punnuk of the Ifugao was inscribed in the Representative List of the Intangible Cultural Heritage of Humanity in 2015 under the multinational inscription of the Tugging Rituals and Games element.

References

Further reading

External links

 
Provinces of the Philippines
Provinces of the Cordillera Administrative Region
1966 establishments in the Philippines
Former sub-provinces of the Philippines
States and territories established in 1966